ASET is a national awarding body in the United Kingdom that provides Awards and Qualifications in post-14 vocational and higher education and training. 

ASET is recognised by the UK Government Department of Innovation, Universities and Skills, by the Learning and Skills Council (LSC) and by the Qualifications and Curriculum Authority (QCA).  ASET is ISO 9000:2000-accredited, an Investor in People (IiP) and a UK limited company. 

ASET works extensively across the UK and has a growing International network. In the UK more than 3,000 ASET learning programmes are delivered by over 800 licensed centres including FE colleges, universities, sixth form and community colleges, LEAs, employers, government agencies, training companies and not-for-profit organizations. More than 100,000 learners receive ASET certificates every year.

External links
ASET official website 

Education in the United Kingdom